The Fayetteville Rifle was a 2 banded rifle produced at the Confederate States Arsenal in Fayetteville, North Carolina.  The machinery which produced these weapons was primarily that captured at the United States Arsenal at Harpers Ferry, Virginia, which was previously used to produce the US Model 1855 Rifle.

The weapon was produced in .58 caliber from early in 1862 until the capture and destruction of the arsenal by Union forces under General W. T. Sherman on March 11, 1865.

In February, 1862, the Fayetteville Observer, in describing the beginning of arms’ manufacturing at the arsenal, reported:

The first examples were manufactured using assorted M1855 lock blanks and are mounted in iron with high and medium high lockplate humps.  Later examples are mounted in brass with a graceful "S" shaped hammer.  Only the very early examples are known to have a patch box.

The rifle was made both with and without a special bayonet lug which allowed the use of a sword bayonet.

The weapons are highly rare and collectible and pristine examples command prices in excess of $25,000.

See also
 Rifles in the American Civil War

References
 Bilby, Joseph G. (2005), Civil War Firearms: Their Historical Background And Tactical Use, Da Capo Press, 252 p., 
 Fadala, Sam (2006), The Complete Blackpowder Handbook: The Latest Guns and Gear, Gun Digest, 446 p., 
 Katcher, Philip, Katcher, Philip R. N. (1986), American Civil War Armies vol. 1, Osprey Publishing, 48 p.,

Notes

Weapons of the Confederate States of America
American Civil War rifles